KVQ was a short-lived Sacramento, California, AM radio station, which operated from February 2, 1922, until December 20 of the same year. It was initially licensed to J. C. Hobrecht, although a few months after its start ownership was transferred to the Sacramento Bee newspaper. KVQ was Sacramento's first broadcasting station.

History
 
KVQ was licensed as Sacramento's first broadcasting station on December 9, 1921, to store owner J. C. Hobrecht. The station's establishment was largely due to the efforts of thirty-year-old Carlos McClatchy, son of the Sacramento Bee's editor and publisher, C. K. McClatchy. Carlos recognized the potential for the then-new idea of radio broadcasting, and convinced the Bee's owners to help finance the new station's operations. An arrangement was made to construct a studio in the newspaper's headquarters at Seventh Street between I and J Streets, with a transmitting antenna atop the building. KVQ made its debut broadcast at 5:30 P.M. on February 2, 1922. The station was primarily used to publicize the Hobrecht store and the Bee, and, as was the common standard at the time, did not accept advertising.

Initially there was only a single wavelength, 360 meters (833 kHz), available for radio station "entertainment" broadcasts, which required stations in various regions to develop timesharing agreements that allocated operating hours. By November 1, 1922, there were seven "Inland Stations" sharing time on 360 meters, with KVQ allocated 6:30 to 7:30 P.M. daily except Sunday, plus 8:00 to 9:00 P.M. Wednesdays, 8:00 to 9:00 P.M. Saturdays, and 6:00 to 7:00 P.M. Sundays.

A few months after the station debuted, ownership was transferred from J. C. Hobrecht to the Bee's publisher, James McClatchy, followed a short time later by a transfer to "Sacramento Bee (James McClatchy Co.)". However, KVQ suspended operations on December 20, 1922 and was formally deleted on January 2, 1923, with the Bee explaining that the station had been shut down in order to "bow to the wishes of Superior California radio fans who sought new fields to conquer and desired the additional quiet hour in the early evening used by the Bee to catch the concerts of stations in far eastern states".

In some accounts KVQ has been credited as being a direct predecessor to station KFBK, which was first licensed as Sacramento's second station on August 16, 1922, and initially operated in conjunction with the Bee's primary newspaper competitor, the Sacramento Union. In 1925 the Bee returned to the broadcasting field after a near three-year absence, joining with KFBK's original owner to convert the station to commercial operations. However, early reviews in the Bee treated KVQ as a separate station from KFBK, and government regulators at the time consistently considered the two to be separate, unrelated stations.

References

Further reading
 Sacramento on the Air: How the McClatchy Family Revolutionized West Coast Broadcasting by Annette Kassis, 2015.

VQ
Radio stations established in 1921
1921 establishments in California
1922 disestablishments in California
Defunct radio stations in the United States
Radio_stations_disestablished_in_1922
VQ